Kfarhata ( known also as Kfar Hata, Kafrhata) is a village located in the Koura District in the North Governorate of Lebanon. It is one of the 52 towns of El-Koura, situated at the southern region of this district, at the other side of Al-Kateh (The cutter); a shallow but wide valley, separating a group of 6 towns from the gigantic El-Koura olive plains.

The population is  Greek Orthodox and Maronite. 

Although the mountainous profile of this town, the olive trees cultivation is equally successful and popular, with high quality of olive oil, extracted with the traditional Koranian cold technique.

See also 
 Amioun
 Koura District

References

External links
Kfar Hata, Localiban

Archaeological sites in Lebanon
Eastern Orthodox Christian communities in Lebanon
Maronite Christian communities in Lebanon
Populated places in the North Governorate
Koura District